Whitefoord is a rural locality in the local government area of Southern Midlands in the Central region of Tasmania. The 2016 census determined a population of 59 for the state suburb of Whitefoord.

History
Whitefoord was gazetted as a locality in 1972. It may have been named for John Whitefoord, a Police Magistrate in the district in the 1830s.

Geography
All boundaries are survey lines.

Road infrastructure
The C310 route (Woodsdale Road / Stonehenge Road) enters from the west and runs through to the south-east, where it exits. Route C318 (a continuation of Woodsdale Road) starts at an intersection with C310 and runs south-east until it exits.

References

Localities of Southern Midlands Council
Towns in Tasmania